Eumimesis is a genus of longhorn beetles of the subfamily Lamiinae.

 Eumimesis affinis Magno & Monné, 1990
 Eumimesis carbonelli Lane, 1973
 Eumimesis germana Lane, 1973
 Eumimesis heilipoides Bates, 1866
 Eumimesis trilineata Magno & Monné, 1990

References

Calliini
Beetles described in 1866
Cerambycidae genera